Benji the Hunted is a 1987 American adventure drama film directed and written by Joe Camp and produced by Ben Vaughn. It is the fourth film in the Benji series. The film is about Benji trying to survive in the wilderness and looking after the orphan cougar cubs after their mother is shot and killed by the hunter. It was released by Walt Disney Pictures. This was the last Benji movie to star Benjean, daughter of Higgins, in the title role.

Plot
In Oregon, Benji has gone missing while filming a movie. Benji's trainer, Frank Inn, tells a reporter that he and Benji had been on a fishing boat in the Pacific when a storm caused the vessel to capsize. Inn fears that Benji is dead but the movie producers plan to use a helicopter to search for him.

The next day, Benji lies near the shoreline when a helicopter flies overhead but he goes unnoticed. Benji wanders the woods and sees a female cougar just as a hunter shoots it. Benji tries to comfort the dying animal but the hunter drives him off and carries away the dead cougar. When the helicopter flies overhead again, Benji runs after it while barking to no avail. Benji encounters four cougar cubs that belong to the killed cougar and decides to look after them. While hunting, Benji comes face to face with a rabbit but spares it. Benji finds a cabin where a quail is being cooked over a fire and two other dead quails are hanging on a line nearby. He takes one of the quails from the line back for the cubs.

The next day, Benji returns to the cabin to get the other dead quail but the hunter catches and ties him up. Reading Benji's collar, the hunter remembers there is a reward for the dog's rescue. When the hunter goes inside, Benji tries to break free. Just then, a black wolf growls at Benji. When the hunter comes outside, the wolf runs away. The wolf returns and Benji makes a commotion. The hunter comes outside, scaring away the wolf. The hunter briefly unties Benji to unravel his rope. Benji grabs the other dead quail and runs back to the cubs.

Benji sees an adult female cougar with a cub and barks but she attacks him. Benji then moves the cubs to a new location, carrying them individually. While doing this, the helicopter flies overhead and Benji sees his trainer in the window. By the time Benji has finished moving the cubs, another animal has eaten the quail. Benji searches for more food. Meanwhile, the wolf begins to move in on the cubs but the helicopter scares him away.

The next day, Benji sees the cougar and the wolf nearby. The wolf chases Benji but Benji manages to escape. Later, the four cubs follow Benji. A large grizzly bear comes into the clearing. Benji and the cubs hide but one of the cubs tries to confront the bear. The bear scares the cub back to the hiding place. When the bear moves toward them, Benji barks and runs in the opposite direction. The bear chases but soon loses interest. However, the wolf appears again and chases Benji for a long distance until Benji leads the wolf to the bear who scares away the wolf.

Later, the female cougar and her cub cross a river just as the helicopter flies overhead, scaring away the cougar. When Benji spots the cougar again, he barks at the cubs to follow him across the stream. The helicopter lands nearby and Inn gets out, calling for Benji who sees him but decides to help the cubs before he can reunite with his owner. Unaware Benji is nearby, Inn leaves in his helicopter. Soon after, an eagle grabs one of the cubs and flies off. When the eagle later approaches the remaining cubs, Benji scares it away. Benji later finds this cub and is back to 4 cubs.

Benji spots the cougar and barks at her until she gives chase but Benji loses her along the way but almost runs off a cliff concealed by bushes. Benji finds the cougar near the waterfall. Benji runs to get the cubs but finds the wolf watching the cubs. Benji barks at the wolf and attacks him to draw his attention. As the wolf gives chase, Benji tricks the wolf by hiding in the bushes concealing the cliff and sends the wolf off the cliff to its death. Benji lures the cubs to come out from under the rock and carries them up the steep mountain. With all four cubs on the mountaintop, the cougar comes and appears to adopts them. Benji goes to rest in plain sight just as the helicopter approaches.

Cast
Benjean as Benji
Frank Inn as himself, Benji's owner
Red Steagall as the hunter
Gideon as Mother Cougar
Malina as Cougar Cub 
Bart the Bear as Bear 
Dimitri as The Wolf
Nancy Francis as Mary Beth McLaulin, a news reporter
Joe Camp as the TV director (voice)
Steve Zanolini as the producer (voice)
Mike Francis as the TV cameraman
Ben Vaughn as the engineer's hand
Karen Thorndike countdown (voice)
Guy Hovis as the balladeer
Ben Morgan as himself

Critical reception

On Siskel & Ebert & The Movies, film critic Roger Ebert gave "Thumbs Up" rating for the film. Gene Siskel gave the film a "Thumbs Down", accusing Ebert of liking the film more than Stanley Kubrick's Full Metal Jacket, which was reviewed in the same episode . In response, Ebert insisted that every film needs to be judged in its proper context.

As of March 2022, Benji the Hunted held a 55% (rotten) rating on Rotten Tomatoes, based on 11 reviews.

It grossed $22,257,624 at the US box office.

The film was subjected to a series of lawsuits, which were filed by Vestron Inc. and Vestron Video against Buena Vista Home Video, Walt Disney Pictures and Television, Embark Productions, Embark Releasing, Benji/Tracker, Starwolf and Airline Containers. The legal action commenced in 1985 when Mulberry Square Productions sued Vestron Video for a breach of contract.

References

External links
 
 
 
 
 
 

1987 films
1987 drama films
Films about dogs
Films set in forests
Walt Disney Pictures films
Films set in Oregon
Films shot in Oregon
Films shot in Astoria, Oregon
Films set in Astoria, Oregon
American children's drama films
1980s children's drama films
Benji
Films directed by Joe Camp
Films scored by Euel Box
1980s English-language films
1980s American films
Films about cougars